This is a list of awards and nominations received by American actor Sam Elliott.

Major associations

Academy Awards

Golden Globe Awards

Primetime Emmy Awards

Screen Actors Guild Awards

Other awards and nominations

AACTA Awards

AARP's Movies for Grownups Awards

Central Ohio Film Critics Association

Chicago Film Critics Association

Critics' Choice Movie Awards

Critics' Choice Television Awards

Dallas–Fort Worth Film Critics Association

Detroit Film Critics Society

Dorian Awards

Georgia Film Critics Association

IndieWire Critics Poll

Los Angeles Online Film Critics Society

National Board of Review

San Diego Film Critics Society

Santa Barbara International Film Festival

Satellite Awards

Washington D.C. Area Film Critics Association

References

External links
 

Elliott, Sam